Bogna Jóźwiak (born April 15, 1983 in Poznań) is a Polish sabre fencer. Jozwiak represented Poland at the 2008 Summer Olympics in Beijing, where she competed in two sabre events.

For her first event, the women's individual sabre, Jozwiak first defeated Venezuela's Alejandra Benitez in the preliminary round of thirty-two, before losing out her next match to U.S. fencer Mariel Zagunis, with a score of 13–15. Few days later, she joined with her fellow fencers and teammates Irena Więckowska and Aleksandra Socha for the women's team sabre. Jozwiak and her team, however, lost the fifth place match to the Russian team (led by Sofiya Velikaya), with a total score of 36 touches.

References

External links
 
Profile – FIE
NBC Olympics Profile

Polish female sabre fencers
Living people
Olympic fencers of Poland
Fencers at the 2008 Summer Olympics
Fencers at the 2016 Summer Olympics
Sportspeople from Poznań
1983 births
21st-century Polish women
20th-century Polish women